Reeta Chakrabarti (born 12 December 1964) is a British journalist, newsreader and correspondent for BBC News. She is known for presenting BBC News at One, BBC News at Six, BBC News at Ten and BBC Weekend News, and presenting regularly on the BBC News Channel and occasionally BBC World News.

She has also reported extensively in the UK and abroad for BBC News.

Early life
Reeta Chakrabarti was born on 12 December 1964 in Ealing, London to an Indian Bengali family and was raised in Birmingham. As a teenager she lived in India, attending the Calcutta International School in Kolkata and King Edward VI High School for Girls.

Chakrabarti studied English and French at Exeter College, Oxford, from 1984 to 1988, including a year in France. Of her time at Oxford, Chakrabarti said, "I loved my time there. There weren’t – then – many people from my background at university. But that didn’t stop my experience from being overwhelmingly good."

Career

BBC Radio 4
Chakrabarti started as a producer on BBC Radio 4, working on the Today programme, The World at One and PM before becoming a reporter on 5 Live Breakfast, in which she covered the French presidential elections, and the Dunblane massacre.

BBC Radio 1
In 1992, she started working at BBC Radio 1, specifically Newsbeat, writing and delivering news bulletins for Steve Wright In The Afternoon and News 92.

BBC News

In 1997 she became one of the BBC's Community Affairs Correspondents, covering the Stephen Lawrence inquest and subsequent Public Inquiry. She also covered home affairs including the Damilola Taylor murder trial and Health. 

As a Political Correspondent at Westminster from 1999 she appeared on both television and radio, reporting on political stories for BBC1, BBC2, the BBC News Channel, BBC Radio 4 and BBC Radio 5 Live. During this time Chakrabarti covered three General Elections, several changes of party leaders, with other notable stories including the Cash for Honours affair and MPs' expenses. Occasionally she presented real-time audience reactions to debates.

In 2010 she became an Education Correspondent and covered changes to university tuition fees, the introduction of free schools, growth in academies and changes to exams and the curriculum. From South Korea, in 2013, she reported on why East Asian pupils had better results than those from Britain in international league tables. 

She has reported on social matters, with stories relating to adoption, poverty, and social mobility in the UK. She reported from a ship in the Mediterranean on the European migrant crisis in 2016 and 2017. During 2017 and 2018, she reported three times on the Rohingya crisis from Bangladesh and Myanmar, and anchored the BBC's coverage of the 70th anniversary of the Partition of India and Pakistan in 2017. She was part of the studio team for the 2019 General Election, and the 2020 US Presidential Election. She was also one of the presenters of the BBC's news coverage of COVID-19 during the lockdowns of 2020 and 2021.

In March 2022 Chakrabarti was the main BBC presenter in Lviv in western Ukraine, anchoring the news bulletins ten days after the 2022 Russian invasion of Ukraine. In April 2022 she anchored the BBC's coverage of the French Presidential election from Paris.

She has also presented on BBC World and Radio 4's The World Tonight.

Awards and honours 
Chakrabarti was named an honorary fellow of Exeter College, Oxford in 2018. She was also made an honorary Doctor of Letters by York St John University in 2018, and became the chancellor of York St John University in 2019 and an honorary fellow of University College, London in 2019. She is also an honorary fellow of the University of East London.

In December 2022 Chakrabarti was a member of the team for Exeter College, Oxford, which reached the semi-final in BBC Two's Christmas University Challenge.

Personal life
Chakrabarti is married to Paul Hamilton, Professor of English at Queen Mary University of London. They live in North London and have three children. She is a fan of the poet John Keats and chose this as her specialist subject on the BBC television quiz Celebrity Mastermind broadcast on 22 December 2016.

Chakrabarti is a Patron of Pan Intercultural Arts, a UK charity that uses the arts to empower marginalised young people and unlock their potential. She is also a patron of the Oxford University Media Society, and became a trustee for the Keats Shelley Memorial Association in 2021. She was a judge for the David Cohen Prize for Literature 2021, which was won by the writer Colm Toibin. In December 2021, Chakrabarti was announced Chair of the Panel of judges choosing the Costa Book of the Year 2021.

References

External links

BBC Profile
Reeta Chakrabarti on Twitter
The Royal Television Society
Profile at University of East London website
The Naz Project
The National Mentoring Consortium
York St John University announces Reeta Chakrabarti as new Chancellor

1964 births
Living people
English people of Indian descent
English people of Bengali descent
English political commentators
People from Ealing
BBC newsreaders and journalists
People educated at King Edward VI High School for Girls, Birmingham
Alumni of Exeter College, Oxford
English women journalists
20th-century British journalists
21st-century British journalists